Al Maarid is a suburb of the city of Ras Al Khaimah, United Arab Emirates (UAE). It is the location of the 475-room Hilton Ras Al Khaimah Resort & Spa hotel.

References

Populated places in the Emirate of Ras Al Khaimah